Dick's Sporting Goods, Inc. (stylized as "DICK'S Sporting Goods") is an American sporting goods retail company, based in Coraopolis, Pennsylvania. The company was established by Richard "Dick" Stack in 1948, and has approximately 854 stores and 50,100 employees. Dick's is America's largest sporting goods retailer, and it is listed on the Fortune 500.

Company overview
Dick's is the largest sporting goods retail company in the United States, with approximately 854 stores, as of 2020. The public company is based in Coraopolis, Pennsylvania, outside Pittsburgh, and has approximately 50,100 employees, as of March 2020. The company's subsidiaries include Field & Stream, Golf Galaxy, and Public Lands, and, previously, Chelsea Collective and True Runner. In 2017, there were 690 Dick's stores, close to 100 Golf Galaxy locations, and approximately 30 Field & Stream stores. The company launched Team Sports HQ, a collection of digital products, following the acquisitions of Affinity Sports, Blue Sombrero, and GameChanger.

Edward W. Stack serves as executive chairman. Lauren Hobart is president and chief executive officer of the company and Lee Belitsky is chief financial officer, as of 2018. Hobart succeeded Edward W. Stack as CEO on February 1, 2021, becoming the company's first female CEO.

History
Richard "Dick" Stack started the company as a fishing tackle store in Binghamton, New York, in 1948. He began with a $300 loan from his grandmother.

Edward W. Stack and his siblings purchased Dick's from their father in the early 1980s, when the company had two locations in Upstate New York. Stack established a board of directors, opened additional stores, and relocated the company's headquarters to Pittsburgh in 1994. He became chairman and chief executive officer following his father's retirement in 1984, and led the company during its initial public offering in 2002.

Dick's operated primarily throughout the Eastern United States, up to 2009, and has since expanded to the Pacific Northwest and West Coast. There were more than 357 Dick's stores in 38 states, as of mid 2008.

In 2012, the company opened three True Runner stores targeting runners in Boston, the St. Louis suburb Brentwood, and Pittsburgh's Shadyside neighborhood. The stores closed in early 2017.

Dick's launched the women's athleisure, fitness, and lifestyle store Chelsea Collective in 2015, opening two stores in Pittsburgh and Tysons, Virginia, in the Washington, D.C. metro area. The shops closed in 2017.

The company launched Dick's Team Sports HQ in early 2016, offering youth sports teams websites, uniforms, and sponsorship options.

Dick's opened its first Field & Stream store in Cranberry Township, a suburb of Pittsburgh, in 2013. Thirty-five Field & Stream stores are open across the country, as of 2018. Jason Aldean became the Field & Stream brand's first spokesperson in August 2016.

Following the Stoneman Douglas High School shooting in February 2018, Dick's stopped selling assault weapons and high-capacity magazines, and increased the minimum age for purchasing guns to 21. Dick's-branded stores had suspended assault-style weapon sales following the Sandy Hook Elementary School shooting in 2012, but the guns were still available for purchase at Field & Stream locations. Dick's has never carried bump stocks.

The company currently operates five distribution centers. The most recent, in Conklin in Southern Tier, New York opened in January 2018, and was further expanded to fulfill online sales a few months later.

In 2019, Dick's launched its private-label clothing line called DSG. The company's other brands include the women's line Calia, and their menswear brand VRST.

Dick's opened its first "House of Sport" concept stores in Victor, New York and Knoxville, Tennessee in 2021. The stores are larger than Dick's flagship locations, sell higher-end gear and include features such as an outdoor turf field and track, climbing wall, batting cages, and a digital golf range. Dick's also launched Public Lands in 2021, a chain of stores that focuses on outdoor recreation including camping, hiking, and biking.

Acquisitions
Dick's acquired Galyan's in July 2004. The company agreed to purchase Golf Galaxy for $225 million in November 2006. Dick's confirmed plans to close Golf Galaxy's headquarters in Eden Prairie, Minnesota in mid 2008.

Dick's purchased the San Diego-based sports management technology company Affinity Sports for an undisclosed amount in mid 2016. In September, Dick's acquired Sports Authority's brand name and intellectual property. There were 450 Sports Authority locations at the time.

Dick's acquired Golfsmith, the largest golf retailer in the United States, at a bankruptcy auction in October 2016. Dick's bid approximately $70 million for all of Golfsmith's intellectual property and inventory. The company planned to retain around 30 of Golfsmith's more than 100 locations, as well as 500 employees. Dick's rebranded 36–38 Golfsmith stores in 16 U.S. states as Golf Galaxy in 2017. This increased the number of Golf Galaxy stores to 98, located in 33 states.

Lawsuits and legal proceedings
 In July 1971, Dick's was told of infringing a patent owned by Furnace Brook, LLC, in a lawsuit filed in the Northern District of Illinois.
 On March 31, 2005, the company restated the first three fiscal quarters of 2004 as well as full-year figures due to adjustments to its accounting for leases and tenant or construction allowances.
 In June 2009, Dick's was accused of infringing a patent owned by The Donkey Company, Inc., in a lawsuit filed in District Court for the District of New Jersey.
 In February 2014, Dick's brought a lawsuit against Modell's Sporting Goods CEO, Mitchell Modell (who featured on an episode of Undercover Boss in 2012), for going undercover into one of their stores to gain access to retail secrets. The lawsuit was settled out of court by April for undisclosed terms. Independent analysts suggested that Modell visited the store on a whim, rather than as part of some plot to steal information.
In 2018, Dick's was sued for age discrimination by at least two people for no longer selling long guns to 18-20 year olds where legal. One case was settled in November 2018; details of the settlement are confidential, but it did not directly result in any changes to the retailer's policies. The second case was reported as "resolved" by an attorney for the plaintiff in late 2018 without disclosing details of any settlement.

Partnerships and sponsorships
The company signed a 20-year naming rights agreement for Dick's Sporting Goods Park, a soccer-specific stadium for the Colorado Rapids team in Commerce City, Colorado, in 2006. Dick's has sponsored the Pittsburgh Penguins and the team's home arena, PPG Paints Arena (formerly Consol Energy Center).

Sporting events sponsored by Dick's have included the Dick's Sporting Goods Open and the Pittsburgh Marathon. Dick's began sponsoring ESPN's college football kickoff week in 2009.

In 2015, the company sponsored Olympic and Paralympic athletes and hopefuls, and became the "official sporting goods retailer" for Team USA for the 2016 Summer Olympics and Paralympics. Dick's and Team USA established the Ambassador Program and Contender's Program in partnership with the United States Olympic Committee, employing Olympians and prospective Olympic athletes. Dick's employed approximately 200 Team USA athletes competing in 35 different Olympic and Paralympic sports, as of March–July 2016. The athletes worked in 89 stores in 32 states.

Dick's partnered with Carrie Underwood in 2015 to launch Calia, a fitness lifestyle line.

In 2017, Dick's entered a multiyear partnership with the United States Youth Soccer Association to provide team management technology and sponsor the US Youth Soccer National Championships.

Since September of 2021, Dick’s has been in a multi-year agreement to be the official retail partner of the WNBA.

Dick's Sporting Goods Foundation 
In 2014, the Dick's Sporting Goods Foundation committed up to $2 million annually to fund youth sports via its Sports Matter program. More than 145 million USD has been pledged for youth sports initiatives, benefiting hundreds of thousands of athletes, as of December 2020. The organization also launched an awareness campaign with Jon Gruden and Michael B. Jordan serving as spokespeople, and worked with director Judd Ehrlich to release We Could Be King, a documentary film about two Philadelphia high school football teams forced to merge due to lack of funding. Following Hurricane Harvey and Hurricane Irma (2017), the foundation donated $2 million to youth sports facilities and program in affected areas, including $120,000 for Houston's reVision soccer team, composed of immigrants from Africa. Dick's later featured the team in a documentary-style advertisement called reVision FC: A Holiday Assist.

In 2019, the Dick's Sporting Goods Foundation launched a campaign to improve access to sports for one million children by 2024.

References

External links

 

1948 establishments in New York (state)
2002 initial public offerings
American companies established in 1948
Clothing retailers of the United States
Companies based in Allegheny County, Pennsylvania
Companies listed on the New York Stock Exchange
Online retailers of the United States
Retail companies established in 1948
Sporting goods retailers of the United States